The Emergence of the American University is a non-fiction book in the history of education by Laurence Veysey, published in the 1965 by University of Chicago Press. It "trac[es] the development of the modern American university during its formative years from 1865 to 1910". It is based on and shortened from Veysey's doctoral dissertation.

Deemed "a major contribution to the history and sociology of American education" when first published, the book continues to garner attention decades after its publication. Kevin Carey says "Fifty years later, the ideas Veysey developed in two years of white-hot scholarly intensity continue to shape our basic understanding of academe."

Christopher Loss called it the "founding text" "for historians interested in tracking the organization, production, and consumption of knowledge in the United States", introducing a 2005 special issue. This 2005 special issue of History of Education Quarterly contains an introduction and 6 essays reflecting on the book, along with an obituary of Veysey, who died in 2004.

References

Further reading 

 
 
 
 
 
 
 
 
 
 
 
 

1965 non-fiction books
American non-fiction books
Books about higher education
History books about education
University of Chicago Press books